Veronica prostrata, the prostrate speedwell or rock speedwell, is a species of flowering plant in the family Plantaginaceae, native to Europe. As it forms a mat of foliage, it is suitable for groundcover or in the alpine garden. Blue flowers are borne in summer, in terminal racemes above paired leaves.

This plant and its cultivar 'Spode Blue' have both gained the Royal Horticultural Society’s Award of Garden Merit.

References 

prostrata